Jesús Mantilla Oliveros was the Minister of Public Health and Social Development of Venezuela up to 2009.

References

Government ministers of Venezuela
Year of birth missing (living people)
Living people